Ratna Fabri was a noted museologist of India who was awarded Padma Shri in 1970 in the Art field for her achievements. Ratna Fabri had studied museums in America and Europe and had displayed arrangements in the Indian pavilion in the Montreal exhibition.

She was married to Charles Fabri, a Hungarian émigré. She hailed from Rajasthan.

External links
Reference to Ratna Fabri, "Leaf from History Museum was also brainchild of Corbusier", tribuneindia.com, 4 March 2003.

Educators from Rajasthan
Women educators from Rajasthan
Recipients of the Padma Shri in arts
Indian museologists
Indian women historians
20th-century Indian historians
20th-century Indian women scientists
20th-century Indian scientists
20th-century women writers